This page lists board and card games, wargames, miniatures games, and tabletop role-playing games published in 2010.  For video games, see 2010 in video gaming.

Games released or invented in 2010

Game awards given in 2010
Mensa Select:     Anomia, Dizios, Forbidden Island, Word on the Street, Yikerz!
Spiel des Jahres: Dixit
Games: Jump Gate
 Troyes won the Spiel Portugal Jogo do Ano.

Deaths

See also

List of game manufacturers
2010 in video gaming

References

Games
Games by year